The 8th arrondissement of Paris (VIIIe arrondissement) is one of the 20 arrondissements of the capital city of France. In spoken French, the arrondissement is colloquially referred to as le huitième ("the eighth").

The arrondissement, called Élysée, is situated on the right bank of the River Seine and centered on the Avenue des Champs-Élysées. The 8th arrondissement is, together with the 1st, 9th, 16th and 17th arrondissements, one of Paris' main business districts. According to the 1999 census, it was the place of employment of more people than any other single arrondissement of the capital. It is also the location of many places of interest, among them the Champs-Élysées, the Arc de Triomphe (partial) and the Place de la Concorde, as well as the Élysée Palace, the official residence and office of the President of France.

Most French fashion luxury brands have their main store in 8th arrondissement, Avenue Montaigne or Rue du Faubourg Saint-Honoré, both in the Champs-Élysées Avenue shopping district. As of 2019, the 8th arrondissement had a population of 35,655.

Geography
The land area of the arrondissement is 3.881 km2 (1.498 sq. miles, or 959 acres).

Population density
The arrondissement had its highest population of 107,485 in 1891.
In 1999, it had almost a third of that number, with 39,310 residents. It is one of Paris' least densely populated arrondissements and contains 1.8% of the total population of Paris.

Historical population

Immigration

Map

Economy

The head offices of AXA, Bouygues, Électricité de France (EDF), Eurazeo, Ki-oon, Sanofi-Aventis, Engie, HSBC Continental Europe and Suez Environnement are located in this arrondissement. Standard & Poor's' France office is located in the 8th arrondissement. Air China and China Southern Airlines have their Paris offices in the arrondissement.

At one time, the head office of Union des Transports Aériens was located in this arrondissement. The predecessor airline, Union Aéromaritime de Transport, also had its head office in the 8th arrondissement. When Suez existed, its head office was in the 8th arrondissement. When Unibail existed, its head office was in the 8th arrondissement. At one time, Groupe Danone had its head office in the 8th arrondissement. At one time, Alcatel-Lucent's head office was located in the 8th arrondissement. At one time, Northwest Airlines had its Paris offices in the Madeleine station. At one time, All Nippon Airways operated a sales office in the 8th arrondissement.

Cityscape

Places of interest

 American Cathedral in Paris
 Arc de Triomphe (one-third, shared with 16th and 17th arrondissements)
 Automobile Club de France
 Avenue des Champs-Élysées
 Chapelle Expiatoire
 Église de la Madeleine
 Église Saint-Augustin
 Élysée Palace
 Four Seasons Hotel George V
 Gare Saint-Lazare
 Grand Palais
 Hôtel de Crillon
 Hôtel de Marigny
 Hôtel de la Marine
 Royal Monceau
 Lycée Chaptal
 Maxim's Art Nouveau "Collection 1900"
 Musée Cernuschi
 Musée Bouilhet-Christofle
 Musée Jacquemart-André
 Musée Nissim de Camondo
 The Obelisk (Obélisque) in the Place de la Concorde
 Pagoda Paris
 Palais de la Découverte
 Parc Monceau
 Petit Palais
 Pinacothèque de Paris
 Place de la Concorde
 Pont Alexandre III
 Pont de l'Alma
 Pont de la Concorde
 Pont des Invalides
 Salle Gaveau
 The Scots Kirk (l'Église écossaise de Paris)
 Théâtre des Champs-Élysées

Districts or neighborhoods
 Quartier des Champs-Élysées
 Quartier du Faubourg-du-Roule
 Quartier de la Madeleine
 Quartier de l'Europe

Streets and squares

Streets

 Allée de la Comtesse-de-Ségur
 Allée Marcel-Proust
 Arcades des Champs-Élysées
 Avenue Beaucour
 Avenue Bertie-Albrecht
 Avenue César-Caire
 Avenue des Champs-Élysées
 Avenue Charles-Girault
 Avenue Delcassé
 Avenue Dutuit
 Avenue Edward-Tuck
 Avenue Ferdousi
 Avenue Franklin-D.-Roosevelt
 Avenue de Friedland
 Avenue Gabriel
 Avenue du Général-Eisenhower
 Avenue George-V
 Avenue Hoche
 Avenue Marceau
 Avenue de Marigny
 Avenue Matignon
 Avenue de Messine
 Avenue Montaigne
 Avenue Myron-T.-Herrick
 Avenue Percier
 Avenue Pierre-Ier-de-Serbie
 Avenue du Président-Wilson
 Avenue Ruysdaël
 Cité Odiot
 Avenue de Selves
 Avenue de Valois
 Avenue Van-Dyck
 Avenue Vélasquez
 Avenue de Wagram
 Avenue Winston-Churchill
 Boulevard des Batignolles
 Boulevard de Courcelles
 Boulevard Haussmann
 Boulevard de la Madeleine
 Boulevard Malesherbes
 Champs-Élysées
 Cité Berryer
 Cité du Retiro
 Cours Albert-Ier
 Cour du Havre
 Cour de l'Horloge
 Cours la Reine
 Cour de Rome
 Galerie de la Madeleine
 Impasse d'Amsterdam
 Impasse d'Antin

 Impasse Bourdin
 Impasse Dany
 Impasse du Docteur-Jacques-Bertillon
 Impasse Fortin
 Impasse Ruffin
 Passage de la Madeleine
 Passage Marignan
 Passage Puteaux
 Passage Saint-Philippe-du-Roule
 Rond-point des Champs-Élysées-Marcel-Dassault
 Rue Pierre Charron
 Rue d'Aguesseau
 Rue Alfred-de-Vigny
 Rue d'Amsterdam
 Rue Andrieux
 Rue d'Anjou
 Rue de l'Arcade
 Rue d'Argenson
 Rue Arsène-Houssaye
 Rue d'Artois
 Rue d'Astorg
 Rue Balzac
 Rue de Bassano
 Rue Bayard
 Rue Beaujon
 Rue de Berne
 Rue Bernoulli
 Rue de Berri
 Rue Berryer
 Rue de la Bienfaisance
 Rue du Boccador
 Rue Boissy-d'Anglas
 Rue de Bucarest
 Rue Cambacérès
 Rue de Castellane
 Rue de Cérisoles
 Rue Chambiges
 Rue Chateaubriand
 Rue Chauveau-Lagarde
 Rue du Chevalier-de-Saint-George
 Rue Christophe-Colomb
 Rue du Cirque
 Rue Clapeyron
 Rue Clément-Marot
 Rue du Colisée

 Rue du Commandant-Rivière
 Rue de Constantinople
 Rue de Copenhague
 Rue Corvetto
 Rue de Courcelles
 Rue Daru
 Rue du Docteur Lancereaux
 Rue Duphot
 Rue de Duras
 Rue d'Édimbourg
 Rue de l'Élysée
 Rue Euler
 Rue du Faubourg-Saint-Honoré
 Rue François-Ier
 Rue de Florence
 Rue Frédéric-Bastiat
 Rue Galilée
 Rue du Général-Foy
 Rue Greffulhe
 Rue du Havre
 Rue Intérieure
 Rue de l'Isly
 Rue Jean-Goujon
 Rue Jean-Mermoz
 Rue Joseph-Sansbœuf
 Rue de La Baume
 Rue La Boétie
 Rue de Laborde
 Rue Lamennais
 Rue Larribe
 Rue de La Trémoille
 Rue Lavoisier
 Rue de Liège
 Rue Lincoln
 Rue de Lisbonne
 Rue de Londres
 Rue Lord-Byron
 Rue Louis-Murat
 Rue de Madrid
 Rue Magellan
 Rue Maleville
 Rue Marbeuf
 Rue de Marignan
 Rue des Mathurins
 Rue de Messine
 Rue de Miromesnil
 Rue Mollien
 Rue de Monceau
 Rue Montalivet
 Rue de Moscou

 Rue Murillo
 Rue de Naples
 Rue de la Néva
 Rue Pasquier
 Rue Paul-Baudry
 Rue Paul-Cézanne
 Rue Pelouze
 Rue de Penthièvre
 Rue de la Pépinière
 Rue Pierre-Charron
 Rue Pierre-Le-Grand
 Rue de Ponthieu
 Rue Portalis
 Rue de Presbourg
 Rue de Provence
 Rue Quentin-Bauchart
 Rue Rabelais
 Rue Rembrandt
 Rue de la Renaissance
 Rue de Rigny
 Rue Robert-Estienne
 Rue du Rocher
 Rue de Rome
 Rue Roquépine
 Rue Roy
 Rue Royale
 Rue Saint-Florentin
 Rue Saint-Honoré
 Rue Saint-Lazare
 Rue Saint-Philippe-du-Roule
 Rue de Saint-Pétersbourg
 Rue des Saussaies
 Rue de Sèze
 Rue de Stockholm
 Rue de Surène
 Rue de Téhéran
 Rue de Tilsitt
 Rue Treilhard
 Rue Tronchet
 Rue Tronson-du-Coudray
 Rue de Turin
 Rue Vernet
 Rue de Vézelay
 Rue de Vienne
 Rue Vignon
 Rue de la Ville-l'Évêque
 Rue Washington
 Villa Nouvelle
 Villa Wagram-Saint-Honoré
 Voie Georges-Pompidou

Squares

 Place de l'Alma
 Place Beauvau
 Place de Budapest
 Place du Canada
 Place Charles de Gaulle
 Place Chassaigne-Goyon
 Place Clemenceau
 Place de Clichy
 Place de la Concorde
 Place de Dublin
 Place de l'Étoile
 Place de l'Europe
 Place François-Ier
 Place Gabriel-Péri

 Place du Général-Brocard
 Place Georges-Guillaumin
 Place du Guatémala
 Place du Havre
 Place Henri-Bergson
 Place Henry-Dunant
 Place du Havre
 Place Jean-Pierre-Lévy
 Place de la Madeleine
 Place de Narvik
 Place du Pérou
 Place Prosper-Goubaux
 Place de la Reine-Astrid
 Place de la République-de-l'Équateur

 Place de la République-Dominicaine
 Place de Rio-de-Janeiro
 Place Saint-Augustin
 Place des Saussaies
 Place des Ternes
 Rond-point des Champs-Élysées-Marcel-Dassault
 Square Beaujon
 Square de Berlin
 Square de la Fondation Rothschild
 Square Jean-Perrin
 Square Louis XVI
 Square Marcel-Pagnol
 Square du Roule

Education

There are two public sixth-form colleges (lycée) in the 8th arrondissement: Lycée Chaptal and Lycée Racine.

Private high schools:
Cours Hattemer
Lycée Fénelon Sainte-Marie

The École de langue japonaise de Paris (パリ日本語補習校 Pari Nihongo Hoshūkō), a supplementary Japanese education programme, has its offices at the Association Amicale des Ressortissants Japonais en France (AARJF) in the 8th arrondissement. The classes are held at the École Maternelle et Primaire Saint Francois d'Eylau in the 16th arrondissement.

Intégrale : Institut d'enseignement supérieur privé has one of its campuses in the 8th arrondissement.

Harvard Business School's Europe Research Centre is located in rue Francois 1er.

References

External links